The McCormick Row House District is a group of houses located in the Lincoln Park community area in Chicago, Illinois, USA. It sits between East and West parts of DePaul University's Lincoln Park Campus and is independent from the school.  They were built between 1884 and 1889 and used by the McCormick Theological Seminary to gain rental income.  They were designed in the Queen Anne Style by the A. M. F. Colton and Son  architects and joined the list of Chicago Landmarks May 4, 1971. The McCormick Row House District also lies within the boundaries of the Sheffield Historic District.

In 1973, the McCormick Theological Seminary made the decision to affiliate with the theological seminaries connected with the University of Chicago. In 1974, several McCormick Row House tenants formed the Seminary Townhouse Association and found buyers for all of the seminary's residential units. McCormick Row Houses are now owned by individual owners, with covenants protecting the treatment and maintenance of building exteriors and public areas such as the McCormick Row House private park.

Notes

External links
Official City of Chicago Lincoln Park Community Map
City of Chicago Landmarks
Driehaus Museum summary of McCormick Row Houses
Seminary Townhouse Association

Chicago Landmarks
Historic districts in Chicago
1880s architecture in the United States